Omochyseus is a genus of beetles in the family Buprestidae, containing the following species:

 Omochyseus omocyrius (Thomson, 1879)
 Omochyseus terminalis Waterhouse, 1887

References

Buprestidae genera